Královka (German: Königshöhe) is a stone observation tower situated 859 metres above the sea level on Nekras Hill in the central Jizera Mountains in the area of Janov nad Nisou, less than a kilometre from Bedřichov. 
The total height of the tower is 23.5 metres and the viewing platform is at a height of 20.5 metres. 102 stairs lead the visitors to the top of the observation tower.

History
The original building was constructed in 1888 and was made of wood. This building was destroyed in 1906 and a new stone observation tower was built in 1907. In 1934 a chalet with a restaurant and possible accommodation was built next to the tower. This chalet replaced the wooden public house from 1890, which burnt down in 1933.

Access to the observation tower
The tower is situated on a busy road connecting the tourist and sports centres of Bedřichov and Hrabětice. The tower can be accessed on foot, cross country skis, by bike, or by car.
On foot - Take the red trail from the cross-country skiing stadium or the blue one from the Centrum Guest House (150 metres from the tourist information centre towards Jablonec nad Nisou).
By bike - Bikers can take cycling path no. 3023 from Bedřichov to Nová louka or go from the Myslivecká Chata past the Lesní Bouda along path no. 3020 uphill for about 1 km. 
On cross country skis - It is possible to take the Jizera Trail from the cross country skiing stadium in winter.
By car - Drive from the central car park in Bedřichov towards Nová louka. There is a large car park at the Královka Observation Tower.

View from the observation tower
One can see the main ridge of the Jizera Mountains, Poland and Germany, Bohemian Paradise, the Giant Mountains, Ještěd, Jablonec nad Nisou and Bedřichov from the tower.

References

External links

 Official website - Hotel Královka

Buildings and structures in the Liberec Region
Populated places in Jablonec nad Nisou District
Observation towers in the Czech Republic
Tourist attractions in the Liberec Region